The House of Vodopić  was a noble family from the city of Dubrovnik and the Republic of Ragusa. The family belonged to the list of late patriciate families of the Ragusan nobility.

Notable members 
Mato Vodopić, Bishop of Dubrovnik

See also 
 Dubrovnik
 Republic of Ragusa
 Dalmatia

References 

Ragusan noble families